Phoebe Lynch McClernon (born December 13, 1997) is an American professional soccer player who plays as a defender for OL Reign of the NWSL.

Early life 
A native of West Chester, Pennsylvania, McClernon captained her high school team at Academy of Notre Dame de Namur, played club soccer for Penn Fusion  Academy and was a member of the Region I Olympic Development Program.

Virginia Cavaliers 
McClernon played college soccer at the University of Virginia. She played four seasons for the Virginia Cavaliers between 2016 and 2019, playing in all 22 games as a freshman but only starting four. She became a starter in her sophomore year and earned All-ACC honors in each of the following three seasons. In 2019, McClernon was part of a UVA backline that posted a stretch of seven consecutive shutouts in ACC play.

Club career

Orlando Pride 
McClernon was selected in the second round (14th overall) of the 2020 NWSL College Draft by Orlando Pride. With preseason and the ensuing NWSL schedule canceled due to the COVID-19 pandemic, McClernon was eventually signed to a short-term contract for the return to play 2020 NWSL Challenge Cup on June 21, 2020. However, the following day the team confirmed they would be withdrawing from the tournament following multiple positive COVID-19 tests among both players and staff.

Växjö 
In August 2020, having been unable to play for Orlando, McClernon was released from her short-term contract in order to join Swedish Damallsvenskan club Växjö for the rest of the season. She made her debut on August 16, 2020, playing the first half of a 2–0 defeat to Vittsjö. In total McClernon made 12 league appearances as Växjö finished in sixth-place in 2020.

Return to Orlando Pride 
On January 22, 2021, McClernon re-signed with Orlando Pride on a two-year contract ahead of the 2021 season. She made her NWSL debut for the club on April 10, 2021, starting in the team's Challenge Cup opener against Racing Louisville. McClernon's early regular season performances were recognized with NWSL Team of the Month honors for May 2021, having started in all four of Orlando Pride's games as the team went unbeaten and finished the month at the top of the table.

OL Reign 
On December 18, 2021, McClernon was traded during the 2022 NWSL Draft to OL Reign in exchange for the 10th overall pick (used to selected Caitlin Cosme), Celia, Leah Pruitt, and a second-round pick in the 2023 NWSL Draft.

International career 
McClernon has been called up to multiple United States under-23 training camps. In March 2018, she appeared in all three games for the under-23 team that competed at the Portland Thorns Invitational.

Career statistics

College

Club 
.

Honors
 with OL Reign
 NWSL Shield: 2022
 The Women's Cup: 2022

References

External links 
 
Phoebe McClernon Virginia profile

1997 births
Living people
People from West Chester, Pennsylvania
American women's soccer players
Women's association football defenders
Soccer players from Pennsylvania
Virginia Cavaliers women's soccer players
Orlando Pride draft picks
Växjö DFF players
Orlando Pride players
Damallsvenskan players
National Women's Soccer League players
American expatriate women's soccer players
American expatriate sportspeople in Sweden
OL Reign players